Trimeresurus erythrurus, commonly known as the red-tailed bamboo pitviper, redtail bamboo pit viper, and redtail pit viper is a venomous pit viper species found in South Asia and Myanmar. No subspecies are currently recognized.

Description

Scalation: dorsal scales in 23–25 longitudinal rows at midbody; first upper labial partially or completely fused to nasal; 9–13 upper labials, 1–2 rows of scales separate upper labials from the suboculars; 11–14 scales in a line between supraoculars; supraoculars rarely divided; temporal scales small, strongly keeled; ventral scales: males 153–174, females: 151–180; subcaudals: males 62–79, females 49–61, usually paired, occasionally unpaired shields present among paired series.

Color pattern: head uniform green, dorsum bright green, light ventrolateral stripe present in males, present or absent in females (Maslin [1942:23] says that the ventrolateral stripe is absent, but M.A. Smith [1943:523] states that it is present in males and variable in females), tail spotted with brown; hemipenes without spines.

Geographic range
Found in eastern India (Assam, Sikkim), Bangladesh, Myanmar, Bhutan, and Nepal. The original type locality given was as "Delta Gangeticum" (Ganges Delta, West Bengal State, eastern India). The type locality given by Boulenger (1896) is "Ganges Delta."

References

Further reading

Cantor, T.E. 1839. Spicilegium serpentium indicorum [parts 1 and 2]. Proc. Zool. Soc. London, 7: 31–34, 49–55.
Cantor, T.E. 1840. Spicilegium Serpentium Indicorum. Ann. Mag. Nat. Hist. (1) 4: 271–279.
Gumprecht, A. 2001. Die Bambusottern der Gattung Trimeresurus Lacépède Teil IV: Checkliste der Trimeresurus-Arten Thailands. Sauria 23 (2): 25–32.
Maslin, T. Paul. 1942. Evidence for the Separation of the Crotalid Genera Trimeresurus and Bothrops, with a Key to the Genus Trimeresurus. Copeia 1942 (1): 18–24.
Smith, M.A. 1943. The Fauna of British India, Ceylon and Burma, Including the Whole of the Indo-Chinese Sub-region. Reptilia and Amphibia. Vol. III.—Serpentes. Secretary of State for India. (Taylor and Francis, Printers). London. xii + 583 pp. (Trimeresurus erythrurus, pp. 522–523.)
Toriba, Michihisa. 1994. Karyotype of Trimeresurus erythrurus. Snake 26 (2): 141–143.

erythrurus
Snakes of Asia
Reptiles described in 1839
Reptiles of Bangladesh
Reptiles of Bhutan
Reptiles of India
Reptiles of Myanmar
Reptiles of Nepal
Taxa named by Theodore Edward Cantor